Frédéric Cissokho (born 19 April 1971 in Rouen, France) is a French former professional footballer who played as a defender. He made 36 appearances in Ligue 2 for Wasquehal in the 1997–98 season .

References

Living people
1971 births
Footballers from Rouen
French footballers
Association football defenders
Ligue 2 players
Championnat National players
Championnat National 2 players
Wasquehal Football players
USL Dunkerque players